The Constitution of the Cisalpine Republic, was the first constitution of the Cisalpine Republic, a sister republic of France under Napoleon Bonaparte, roughly comprising the modern-day northern regions of Lombardy and Emilia-Romagna. It came into effect on 20 messidor V (8 July 1797).

It established a directorial republic, which effectively was French puppet. The parliament had an upper house of 60 aldermen and a lower house of 120 members, both appointed by Napoleon. The territory was divided in French-like departments and municipalities. Every noble title was abolished.

This constitution did not survive a year since Napoleon left Italy towards Egypt in 1798.

References

External links

 Constitution des républiques française, cisalpine et ligurienne (1799)

Law of Italy
Cisalpine Republic
1797 in law
1797 in Italy
1797 documents